National Zoological Gardens of Sri Lanka (also called Dehiwala Zoo or Colombo Zoo) is a zoological garden in Dehiwala, Sri Lanka, founded in 1936. It is home to various birds, mammals, reptiles, fish and amphibians. The zoo not only exhibits animals from Sri Lanka, but also exhibits species from across Asian and other parts of the globe.

As of 2005, the zoo has 3,000 animals and 350 species. The annual revenue is LKR 40 million.

The Dehiwala Zoo exchanges its residents with other zoological gardens for breeding purposes. In June 2021, a lion named Thor which had been living in the zoo since 2012 reportedly tested positive for COVID-19.

History

Sri Lanka has a history of collecting and keeping wild animals as pets by both Sri Lankan kings as well as by European colonisers. What is known today as the National Zoological Gardens of Sri Lanka was founded by John Hagenbeck in the late 1920s. During John Hagenbeck's ownership of the zoos the facility was used as a collection centre by his colleague Heinz Randow who collected numerous native and exotic species from across Asia, for Hagenbeck's zoo; Tierpark Hagenbeck. Randow collected numerous native species like; Tufted grey langur, Purple-faced langur, Toque macaque, Sloth bear,  Sri Lankan leopard, Asian water monitor, Axis deer and Sambar deer and other Asian species like; Asiatic black bear, Bengal tiger, Malayan tiger, Malayan Tapir, rhesus macaque, Bonnet macaque, a variety of pythons, fish and invertebrates.

Before World War I, the Dehiwala Zoo was also involved in Ethnographic Expositions (human zoo exhibits) and functioned as holding quarters for live human exhibits collected from around the region.

The zoo was closed at the beginning of World War II in 1939 because the company's owner was German. After the liquidation of Zoological Garden Company in 1936, the government acquired much of the collection and added it to the Dehiwala Zoo (Zoological Garden of Ceylon) collection. Although Dehiwala Zoo officially began operating in 1939, an impressive animal collection already existed as part of the Hagenback company's holding area where the public could visit.

Major Aubrey Neil Weinman, OBE was the first Director of the Dehiwala Zoo. During his tenure, various programs were developed, such as introducing more native and foreign species, launching educational and conservation programs, and improving the facilities and infrastructure. Aubrey Neil Weinman went on to help design the National Zoo of Malaysia.

After Major Aubrey Neil Weinman's retirement Lyn de Alwis, took over as the zoo Director. Lyn de Alwis played a key role in the development of the zoo. During his tenure the zoo was considered one of the best zoos in the world. This fame led him to be contracted to help design both the Singapore Zoo and Night Safari, Singapore. Lyn de Alwis was able to acquire several rare species for the zoo like; Western gorilla, clouded leopard, red panda, Kodiak bear, North China leopard, Chinese mountain cat, Oriental stork and Chinese giant salamander.

By 1969, half of the collection consisted of native species including virtually all of the mammals represented. In 1973, the zoo had 158 mammal species, 259 bird species, 56 reptile species and seven fish species. However, not much was reported on the size of zoo collection until the 1980s.

Zoo

Dehiwala Zoological Garden is one of the oldest zoological gardens in Asia. It has a substantial collection of worldwide animals, being open year-round and accessible via public transportation. The diversity of the zoo is shown its in aquarium, two walk-through aviaries, reptile house, butterfly garden and many enclosures of varying sizes.

The zoological garden has a small but picturesque butterfly garden which is decorated with small shrubs, trees, creepers and small streams. The internal temperature and humidity of the house is controlled by artificially created mist. The butterfly garden exhibits 30 species of butterflies in all stages of their life cycles for educational purposes.

Landscape

The zoo has dense tree coverage and well-landscaped gardens. To provide more natural habitats some lawns of the Zoo have been converted into small forest patches which are rich in rare plants. Valuable medicinal plants are prominent among the trees in these patches.

The zoo consists of shaded pathways with arched cemented bridges for crossing animal enclosures although other equally attractive alternatives exist.

Museum
The museum section displays animal remains such as skeletons, footprints, eggs, excrements and specimen as well as preserved mammals and birds.

Animal shows

Elephant performances

The elephant performances are held at the elephant arena. Pachyderms perform antics such as standing on their heads, wiggling their backs to music, hopping on one foot and standing up on their hind legs.

Educational programme on chimps

One of the main attractions of the Dehiwala Zoo is the baby chimpanzee Sanju. He was hand raised and now his show is conducted as an educational programme about the chimpanzee's behaviours.

Sea lion performances

The sea lions' performances are displayed daily at the sea lions' pool. Two California sea lions are fed by their keepers. Unfortunately, this sea lion was housed in a measly enclosure with a makeshift bathtub in which to swim when not performing.

Animals 

The zoo consists of diverse indigenous species as well as foreign wildlife including mammals, reptiles, birds and fish, destined for a horrible and torturous time spent. Every year the zoo exchanges some of its animals with other zoos around the world to enlarge the diversity of its animals and introduce new species of animals as well.

Dehiwala Zoo always trying to expand its animal collection by introducing new species. In 2008, a three-month-old seal was brought to Sri Lanka from the Krefeld Zoo in Germany.

A green anaconda (Eunectes murinus) which was brought to Sri Lanka along with a male of her species, gave birth to 23 baby anacondas in the Dehiwala Zoo in 2008, and 20 of them survived. This was a very rare occasion of giving birth while in captivity, especially in a relatively unfamiliar territory.

The ongoing animal breeding program is helpful for increasing the population of some animal species in the zoo, and it also important for conservation of endangered species.

The zoo currently houses many different species of mammals including; Sri Lankan elephant,  lion, jaguar, tiger, Sloth bear, Brown bear, Rusty-spotted Cat, Sumatran orangutan, Common chimpanzee, Lar Gibbon, Hamadryas baboon, Ring-tailed lemur, Silvery lutung, Purple-faced Leaf Monkey, Chapman's Zebra, Przewalski's Horse, Eastern Black Rhinoceros, Reticulated Giraffe, Hippopotamus, Pygmy hippopotamus, Arabian Oryx, Scimitar-horned Oryx and Nilgai.

The zoo exhibits their birds in a variety of exhibits including 2 large walk-though aviaries small cages and open air unenclosed ponds. These exhibits house a large array of birds including; Spot-billed Pelican, White-bellied Sea Eagle, Emu, Ostrich, Southern Cassowary, Macaws, Owls, Great Argus, Scarlet Ibis, Victoria Crowned Pigeon, Mute Swan, Malabar Pied Hornbill, Sri Lankan Grey Hornbill, Violet turaco, Green turaco, Red-crested turaco and Southern hill myna.

Many of the zoo's reptiles are housed at the reptile house. the zoo has a large collection of crocodilians often not seen in Asian zoos. Some of the notable reptiles housed at the zoo are as follows; Green Anaconda, Indian Cobra, Russell's viper, Carpet Python, Cat snake,Krait, Dwarf crocodile, Saltwater crocodile, mugger crocodile, Cuban Crocodile, Gharial, False Gharial, Komodo Dragon, Malagasy ground boa, Galapagos Giant Tortoise, African Spurred Tortoise, Indian Star Tortoise (Sri Lankan) and Green Sea Turtle.

New additions to the zoo

The table contains the introduction of new animal species which have been imported by the zoo administration. Many of these species were obtained through exchange programmes with foreign zoos from across the globe, while others were outright purchases, made by the zoo.

Conservation success
The zoo breeds numerous endangered species from across the globe. They have been able to breed; Pygmy Hippos, Common Hippopotamus, Eastern Black Rhinoceros, Chapman's Zebra, Przewalski's Horses, Reticulated Giraffes, Arabian Oryx, Scimitar-horned Oryx, Lar gibbons, Sumatran Orangutans, Silvery lutung and Bengal tigers.

Facilities for visitors

Elephant rides, pony rides, restaurants, ice cream shop, and a souvenir shop are available facilities for the visitors.

Gallery

See also
 Pinnawala Elephant Orphanage
 Pinnawala Open Zoo
 Ridiyagama Safari Park

References

External links

 Sightseeing in Colombo

Zoos in Sri Lanka
Tourist attractions in Western Province, Sri Lanka
Zoos established in 1936
British colonial architecture in Sri Lanka
Buildings and structures in Colombo District